T. J. Frier (born August 17, 1977) is a former American football defensive tackle who played one season with the Los Angeles Avengers of the Arena Football League. He played college football at the University of Memphis and attended Dyer County High School in Newbern, Tennessee. He was also a member of the Seattle Seahawks, Berlin Thunder and Memphis Maniax. He is now a PE teacher at Truman Middle School in Tacoma Washington.

Professional career

Seattle Seahawks
Frier spent the 1999 and 2000 off-seasons with the Seattle Seahawks of the National Football League.

Berlin Thunder
Frier spent the 2000 season with the Berlin Thunder of NFL Europe.

Memphis Maniax
Frier played for the Memphis Maniax of the XFL in 2001, recording five tackles.

Los Angeles Avengers
Frier was signed by the Los Angeles Avengers on April 11, 2001. He was released by the Avengers on November 2, 2001.

References

External links
Just Sports Stats

Living people
1977 births
Players of American football from North Dakota
American football defensive tackles
African-American players of American football
Memphis Tigers football players
Berlin Thunder players
Memphis Maniax players
Los Angeles Avengers players
Sportspeople from Grand Forks, North Dakota
Dyer County High School alumni
21st-century African-American sportspeople
20th-century African-American sportspeople